Christ the Gardener is an oil on canvas painting by Édouard Manet, executed from 1856 to 1859, one of his few religious works. It shows the risen Christ in the Noli me tangere episode, although unusually Mary Magdalene is not shown. It is now in a private collection.

References

1859 paintings
Paintings of Noli me tangere
Paintings by Édouard Manet